Francis Dixon was a cricketer.

Francis Dixon may also refer to:

Francis Dixon (lacrosse), Canadian lacrosse player
Francis Burdett Dixon (1836–1884), Australian trade unionist
Francis Dixon, Sheriff of Cambridgeshire and Huntingdonshire 1757

See also
Frank Dixon (disambiguation)